The Halifax and District Carters' and Motormen's Association was a trade union in the United Kingdom. It merged with the Transport and General Workers' Union in 1936.

See also

 List of trade unions
 Transport and General Workers' Union
 TGWU amalgamations

References
The Story of the TGWU General Executive Council of the Transport and General Workers Union, 1977 pg. 46

Defunct trade unions of the United Kingdom
Road transport trade unions
Transport and General Workers' Union amalgamations
Trade unions disestablished in 1936
Trade unions based in West Yorkshire